Kunturillu (Quechua for "black and white", Hispanicized spelling Condorillo) is a mountain in the Andes of Peru, about  high. It is situated in the Ayacucho Region, Huanca Sancos Province, Sancos District.

References

Mountains of Peru
Mountains of Ayacucho Region